Eastern Suburbs (now known as the Sydney Roosters) competed in the 21st New South Wales Rugby League season in 1924.

Details
Home Ground:
Lineup:-

Results

Premiership Round 1, Saturday 3 May 1924;
Eastern Suburbs 14 defeated Newtown 13 at Sydney Sports Ground.
Premiership Round 2, Saturday 10 May 1924;
Eastern Suburbs 28 defeated North Sydney 11 at Sydney Cricket Ground.
Premiership Round 3, Saturday 17 May 1924;
University 15 defeated Eastern 	Suburbs 13 at Sydney Cricket Ground.
Premiership Round 4, Saturday 24 May 1924 - Eastern Suburbs 15 defeated Balmain 2 at Sydney Sports Ground. 
This was Balmain club's only loss in the shortened season.
Premiership Round 5, Saturday 14 June 1924 - St George 9 defeated Eastern Suburbs 0 at Sydney Sports Ground.
Premiership Round 6, Saturday 5 July 1924;
South Sydney 11(C. Blinkhorn, B. Wearing, O. Quinlivan Tries; Horder Goal) defeated Eastern Suburbs 3 at Sydney Sports Ground.
Premiership Round 7, Saturday 12 July 1924
Glebe 27 defeated Eastern Suburbs 7 at Sydney Cricket Ground.
Premiership Round 8, Eastern Suburbs - Bye	
Premiership Round 9, Saturday 26 July 1924;
Western Suburbs 18 defeated Eastern Suburbs 5 at Pratten Park.

References

External links
Rugby League Tables and Statistics

Sydney Roosters seasons
East